The Broken is a 2008 French-British horror film written and directed by Sean Ellis and starring Lena Headey.

Plot
Gina McVey, a successful radiologist, is examining x-rays of a patient with Situs Inversus, an uncommon condition in which a person is born with their heart and other organs reversed or mirrored from their normal positions. On the birthday of her father, John, Gina, along with her boyfriend Stefan Moreau, her brother Daniel and his girlfriend Kate Coleman surprise John in his home. In the middle of the dinner party, a mirror previously knocked askew when John entered the room falls and shatters. Kate and Gina proceed to clean the shards and discuss that breaking mirrors is a sign of bad luck. At work the next day, Gina is baffled by her assistant Anthony when he tells her that he just saw her walking out of the building. Gina explains that she has been inside the whole time. On her way home however, she sees a woman who looks exactly like her driving a car identical to hers, so Gina follows the woman to her flat and sees a picture of her and her dad inside the woman's room. A frightened Gina runs out of the building and drives her car seemingly disturbed at what she saw, and ends up colliding head on with another car in the middle of the road. Gina awakens in a hospital with no memory of the accident. She is introduced to a therapist Dr. Robert Zachman who leaves his business card. Gina is released and Stefan takes her home.

Back at Stefan's flat, Gina notices his mirror is missing and he explains he broke it by accident. Stephan goes to take the dog out and it snaps at him, which is peculiar. Gina runs a bath and while relaxing in the tub, she notices a leak in the ceiling and goes to check on it in the attic but is stopped by Stefan who appears to be cold and less emotional than earlier appearances in the film. Gina sleeps fitfully that evening and has flashbacks of her father's birthday party, the accident as well as unearthly scenes and a frightening sexual encounter with a seemingly Stefan. Frightened by these developments, Gina contacts Dr. Zachman about her concerns that the man known as Stefan is not really her boyfriend at all. Dr. Zachman suggests this may be a form of Capgras delusion, a rare psychological condition also known as impostor syndrome, brought on by brain damage and/or memory loss sustained in the car crash. He advises more tests to be performed and recommends Gina visit her wrecked car in hopes that it will help her remember the events surrounding the accident.

Meanwhile, Daniel and Kate arrive home to see their neighbor in the stairwell. The neighbor is clearly disturbed and appears to be about to say something. However, his wife watches the man expressionlessly through a crack in the door. The neighbor does not finish what he has to say, and nervously goes into the apartment with his wife.

Gina goes to the auto shop to examine her car, and finds the picture she found of her and John from the woman's flat. While investigating her car, Gina hears the sound of breaking glass and turns to see two identical dogs fighting each other next to a broken mirror. She visits John in his office at the American Embassy and shows him the picture. He begins to worry about what has gotten into his daughter's mind. Later, John's secretary mentions seeing him on the street during lunch, but he tells her he hadn't left the office all day. He goes into the Embassy's men's room where he finds the mirror broken on the floor.

Kate arrives at her home to find that Daniel is not there. As Kate peers into the hallway mirror, a being in what appears to be a dark, shadowy version of her house looks back at her. Unaware of her observer, Kate takes a shower, but is disturbed by the sound of a mirror breaking. Suddenly, a woman who looks exactly like her enters the bathroom and murders Kate.

Back to Gina who is at the subway station, picture in hand, when someone bumps into her, making her drop the photo which flies onto the subway rail. Gina gets on the ground to reach down for it when she hears a train coming just around the bend. She finally stretches far enough and narrowly escapes being hit by the train, but successfully grabs the picture. Gina visits her father at home where he tells her the doctor called him and voiced his concerns regarding Gina's opinion that Stefan has changed. She then relays the events that unfolded that day and shows John the picture, to which he replies, "Maybe it's not me." Gina phones Stefan to check on him but he does not answer. She goes back to Stefan's flat to find it deserted. Gina hears the water leaking once more and goes to the attic to investigate where she finds Stefan, dead, with his head smashed onto a pipe. Panicking, Gina calls John for help but when a man who looks like John appears out of the shadows from behind him, they are disconnected.

Scared, Gina runs into the bathroom and locks the door. Someone jiggles the door knob from outside and pounds on the door trying to break it open, but Gina gets out through the bathroom window. Suddenly, the door breaks open and a man looking exactly like Stefan walks into the room. We then see Gina running down the street and into a phone booth where she relives parts of her day and picks up the phone receiver and calls her brother, Daniel. Gina explains everything to Daniel about the woman she saw who looks like her and that she followed the woman to her flat. Daniel realizes that Gina is talking about her own home and tells Gina that's where she lives. Gina ends the call. Daniel hangs the phone up, turns and sees broken mirror pieces on the floor. Puzzled, he walks further into the apartment when he begins to hear scrubbing noises and follows the sound to the bathroom where he sees Kate scrubbing the blood stained floor. Daniel calls to Kate who stands up and they look at each other with no emotion.

Gina arrives at her flat and is let in the building by the night watchman. Gina gets a spare key to her apartment from him and he asks if he should make her another key to which she replies no, she has another set somewhere. Gina continues to her flat and quietly walks in. When she goes into the bathroom, Gina finds a dead body of herself with a plastic bag over her head. Gina pulls the bag off the duplicate's head, which causes previously suppressed memories she had been struggling to remember to come flooding back to her. Gina backs up, crying, looks up and suddenly remembers coming home, seeing something that frightened her. She drops her wallet, glass breaks and she sees herself putting the plastic bag over her head and murdering the real Gina. More memories flit by as Gina processes everything, then she goes to the living room window which she looks out and down at her father, John, who is standing on the sidewalk looking up at her.

The film concludes as Mirror Gina is examining x-rays of herself showing that she too now has Situs Inversus, implying that the patient from the beginning of the film along with others are also being replaced by doppelgangers from the other side of the mirror. Daniel comes to see Gina at the hospital, but realizes that she has been replaced similar to how Gina earlier realized that Stefan was not Stefan anymore. Daniel runs away as Mirror Gina stares at him and smiles. Mirror Gina is then seen driving her car to destinations unknown while smiling eerily.

Cast
Lena Headey as Gina McVey, a "young and beautiful radiologist", who is the protagonist of the story.
Richard Jenkins as John McVey
Asier Newman as Daniel McVey
Michelle Duncan as Kate Coleman
Melvil Poupaud as Stephan Moreau
Howard Ward as Jim
Andrew Havill as Dr. Myers
Damian O'Hare as Anthony
Lobo Chan as Harry Lee

Release
The film premiered on 18 January 2008 as part of the 2008 Sundance Film Festival. It also was the first choice in Horrorfest 2009 and was part of Sitges Film Festival 2008, where Angus Hudson won the award for Best Cinematography.

References

External links

2008 horror films
French independent films
French horror films
British horror films
Films shot in England
2000s English-language films
2008 psychological thriller films
2000s psychological horror films
French supernatural horror films
British independent films
British supernatural horror films
2000s British films
2000s French films